Alex Hutchings may refer to:
 Alex Hutchings (ice hockey)
 Alex Hutchings (guitarist)